Liu Xinglong (born 10 January 1956) is a Chinese novelist who is the vice president of Hubei Writers Association and vice president of the Wuhan Literature and Art Association.

Biography
Liu was born in Huanggang, Hubei in January 1956. Liu graduated from Hongshan High School in 1973. After graduation, Liu worked as a worker in factory between 1974 and 1985.

Liu started to publish works in 1984 and he joined the China Writers Association in 1993.

Works

Novels
 Skywalker
 English translation: The Sky Dwellers, translated by Emily Jones. Aurora Publishing, 2016.
 Political Lesson
 Weifenglinlin
 Love Forever

Novellas
 Fenghuangqin
 Qiufengzuile

Proses and poems
 A Drop of Water

Awards
 Skywalker – 8th Mao Dun Literature Prize (2011)
 Carrying A Load of Tea Go To Beijing – 1st Lu Xun Literary Prize
 7th Zhuang Zhongwen Literary Prize

References

Sources
 刘醒龙：50年代写小说能买房 
 刘醒龙:很多教授加起来不如韩寒郭敬明受关注 

1956 births
People from Huanggang
Writers from Hubei
Living people
Mao Dun Literature Prize laureates
Chinese male novelists